Ingelin Noresjø (born 21 March 1976) is a Norwegian politician for the Christian Democratic Party.

Early life and education
She hails from Fauske and took her education at Bodø University College and the University of Western Australia.

Political career
In 2011, she entered politics, being elected member of Fauske municipal council and Nordland county council. She progressed into the county government of Nordland where she served as County Commissioner of Culture, Environment and Public Health from 2015 to 2020. She was then a State Secretary in the Ministry of Transport from 2020 to 2021, serving in Solberg's Cabinet.

In her party, Noresjø worked as county secretary from 2005 to 2011 and served as second deputy leader of the nationwide party from 2019. She resigned in February 2022 in order to become project leader for a green land transport program.

References

1976 births
Living people
People from Fauske
Norwegian expatriates in Australia
Norwegian state secretaries
Christian Democratic Party (Norway) politicians
Nordland politicians